The Mohammed VI Center for Dialogue of Civilizations is a mosque in Coquimbo, Chile. The structure is a replica of the Kutubiyya Mosque in Marrakesh. It was funded by the Kingdom of Morocco and the municipality of Coquimbo, being named in honor of king Mohammed VI of Morocco. The mosque receives 25 thousand visitors every year.

Construction began in 2004, led by Moroccan architect Faissal Cherradi, and finished in 2007. The building was inaugurated by then mayor of Coquimbo Oscar Pereira and Moroccan delegates.

The complex also contains a cultural center, a library and a museum. A renovation project funded by the municipality of Coquimbo and the embassy of Morocco in Chile began in 2019.

See also 
 Islam in Chile
 Mezquita As-Salam

References

External links 

Mohammed VI Center for Dialogue of Civilizations

Mosques completed in 2007
Mosques in Chile
Buildings and structures in Coquimbo Region
Buildings and structures completed in 2007